An angle bracket or angle brace or angle cleat is an L-shaped fastener used to join two parts generally at a 90 degree angle. It is typically made of metal but it can also be made of wood or plastic. The metallic angle brackets feature holes in them for screws. Its typical use is to join a wooden shelf to a wall or to join two furniture parts together.

Retailers also use names like corner brace, corner bracket brace, shelf bracket, or L bracket.

When the holes are enlarged for allowing adjustments, the name is angle stretcher plates or angle shrinkage.

Types 
There are different sizes available, varying in length, width and angle.

See also 
 Shelf supports have many variations, including angle brackets

Fasteners
Furniture components